Gironès is a comarca (county) in eastern Catalonia, Spain, bordering  Selva, Baix Empordà, Alt Empordà, Pla de l'Estany and Garrotxa. , more than half of the comarca's 175,148 inhabitants live in the capital, Girona, which is also the capital of the province of Girona.

Municipalities

References and notes

External links 
Official comarcal web site 

 
Comarques of the Province of Girona